Monkey Me is the ninth studio album by French singer-songwriter Mylène Farmer, and her 18th album overall. Preceded by the lead single "À l'ombre", which peaked at number-one in France, the album was released on 3 December 2012. Despite mixed reviews from critics, it entered the French album chart at number one selling almost 150,000 copies in its first week. The album was certified 3× Platinum within its first month of release in France.

The album was supported by the sold-out Timeless tour the following year.

Critical reception
In France, the album entered the charts at number one on 15 December 2012, with cumulative sales of 147,530 units (137,590 physical formats and 9,940 downloads), which was the best weekly sales of 2012 in France.

Despite its strong sales, the album received mixed reviews from the press. On one hand, many critics welcomed the return of Laurent Boutonnat in the songwriting process; on the other hand, others, for example the magazine 7 sur 7, found the arrangements very dated.

Singles

 "Quand" was released as a lyric video.
 For the first time in her career, Farmer invited her fans to design the official cover of the single "Monkey Me" and post their creations on Twitter or Instagram so that she can choose her favorite one.

Track listing

Charts

Weekly charts

Year-end charts

Certifications and sales

Formats
 Limited Numbered Edition Collector Box (CD + Pure Audio Blu-ray)
 Limited Edition Digipak CD (CD + Pure Audio Blu-ray)
 2 × Vinyl
 CD

References

2012 albums
Mylène Farmer albums